This article contains information, results and statistics regarding the Australian national cricket team in the 2008-09 cricket season. Statisticians class the 2008–09 season as those matches played on tours that started between September 2008 and April 2009.

Player contracts
The 2008-09 list was announced on 9 April 2008. Note that uncontracted players still are available for selection for the national cricket team.

Match summary

M = Matches Played, W = Won, L = Lost, D = Drawn, T = Tied, NR = No Result * = Not all games played yet

Series Summary

Champions Trophy

Australia were due to play in the 2008 ICC Champions Trophy in Pakistan between 12 September and 28 September, however due to security concerns from several nations, the tournament was postponed until October 2009.

Tour of India

Australia arrived in India in September for a 4 Test series against the Indian cricket team. A tour match in late September starts the tour and it concludes after the final Test in November.

Tour matches

Tour Match: 27–28 September, Jaipur

Tour Match: 2–5 October, Hyderabad

Test series

First Test

Australian XI: Matthew Hayden, Simon Katich, Ricky Ponting (c), Michael Hussey, Michael Clarke, Shane Watson, Brad Haddin (wk), Cameron White, Brett Lee, Mitchell Johnson, Stuart Clark

Test debut: Cameron White

2nd Test

3rd Test

4th Test

India won the series 2-0-2

New Zealand in Australia (First Leg)

Test series
The first leg comprises two Test match series.

First Test: 20–24 November, Brisbane

Second Test: 28 November-2 December, Adelaide

Australia won the series 2-0-0.
New Zealand then goes home for a series against the West Indies and Australia will host the South African team. New Zealand returns to Australia on 29 January 2009 for the second leg.

South Africa in Australia 

South Africa arrived in Australia for a 3 Tests, 2 Twenty20's and 5 ODI's against the Australian cricket team.

Test series

First Test

Second Test

Third Test 

South Africa won the series 2-1-0

Twenty20 Series

1st Twenty20

Australia won the toss and elected to bat.

2nd Twenty20

South Africa won the toss and elected to bat.

Australia won the series 2-0-0

ODI Series

1st ODI

Australia won the toss and elected to bat.

2nd ODI

South Africa won the toss and elected to field.

3rd ODI

4th ODI

5th ODI

South Africa won the series 4-1-0

New Zealand in Australia (Second Leg)
New Zealand returns for the second leg, consisting of a tour match against the Prime Minister's XI, five One Day Internationals (ODIs) against Australia and a Twenty20 International also against Australia.

ODI Series

1st ODI

2nd ODI

3rd ODI

4th ODI

5th ODI

Match was a washout

Twenty20

Twenty20

Important events

See also

 Australia national cricket team
 International cricket in 2008-09

References

Australia in international cricket
National